The German Chambers of Commerce Abroad  ("Außenhandelskammer" in German, also known by the abbreviation "AHK")  support German companies with establishing and extending  business relations in 90 countries and 130 locations (e.g. the AHK USA). The AHKs also promote trade and joint business between Germany and a foreign country.

German chambers of Commerce Abroad have three main tasks: 
 They represent German business interests in their countries and promote Germany as a business location. 
 The chambers interact with politics, business and government in the respective countries to promote bilateral business relations.
 The chambers provide services to companies both from Germany and their host countries in order to support their foreign business activities, market entry, investment and export under the brand "DEInternational".
Typical services include economic and legal information, organization and support services for meetings, representations of German fairs abroad, market studies, technological transfer, environmental protection, promotion of trade and investment, public relation activities and further vocational training.

The umbrella organisation of the AHKs is the Association of German Chambers of Industry and Commerce (DIHK), which coordinates and supports the German Chambers. Furthermore, cooperation with various German trade associations strengthens the link between German chambers of Commerce Abroad and business and markets.

See also

Association of German Chambers of Industry and Commerce
Business association
Lobbying
Non-governmental organization
Trade group

German chambers of Commerce Abroad on Wikipedia:

German American Chambers of Commerce
Indo-German Chamber of Commerce
 German-Thai Chamber of Commerce

References

External links
 Official website of German Chambers of Commerce Abroad - in German -
 DEinternational, the brand name of the AHKs
 Website of DIHK 
 Germany Trade and Invest
 English online directory of selected German Chambers of Commerce Abroad
 German American Chambers of Commerce 

Trade unions in Germany
German Chambers of Industry and Commerce
German Chambers of Industry and Commerce